Wayne Township is a township in Armstrong County, Pennsylvania, United States.  The population was 1,296 at the 2020 census, an increase over the figure of 1,200 tabulated in 2010.

Geography
Wayne Township is located in northeastern Armstrong County, bordered to the east by Indiana County. Mahoning Creek forms part of its northern border. The township completely surrounds the borough of Dayton.

Demographics

As of the census of 2000, there were 1,117 people, 404 households, and 319 families residing in the township.  The population density was 25.0 people per square mile (9.7/km2).  There were 462 housing units at an average density of 10.3/sq mi (4.0/km2).  The racial makeup of the township was 99.28% White, and 0.72% from two or more races.

There were 404 households, out of which 30.4% had children under the age of 18 living with them, 67.8% were married couples living together, 6.7% had a female householder with no husband present, and 20.8% were non-families. 19.8% of all households were made up of individuals, and 10.9% had someone living alone who was 65 years of age or older.  The average household size was 2.76 and the average family size was 3.12.

The township median age of 37 years was significantly less than the county median age of 40 years. The distribution by age group was 26.3% under the age of 18, 7.0% from 18 to 24, 27.2% from 25 to 44, 23.8% from 45 to 64, and 15.7% who were 65 years of age or older.  The median age was 37 years. For every 100 females there were 103.5 males.  For every 100 females age 18 and over, there were 102.7 males.

The median income for a household in the township was $31,071, and the median income for a family was $33,882. Males had a median income of $29,125 versus $19,219 for females. The per capita income for the township was $13,969.  About 8.6% of families and 12.8% of the population were below the poverty line, including 21.3% of those under age 18 and 4.9% of those age 65 or over.

History
Wayne Township appears in the 1876 Atlas of Armstrong County, Pennsylvania. Its early history is detailed in Robert Walter Smith's 1883 History of Armstrong County.

Cemeteries
Belknap Cemetery
Concord Presbyterian Church Cemetery
Dayton Glade Run Cemetery
Echo Methodist Episcopal Church / White Cemetery
Jerusalem Cemetery
McCreas Furnace Cemetery
Milliron Family Cemetery
Milton Cemetery
Saint Michaels Episcopal Cemetery

References

Populated places established in 1800
Townships in Armstrong County, Pennsylvania